The Improved Launch Control System was a system used by the United States Air Force's Minuteman II intercontinental ballistic missile force.  The system was a method to transfer targeting information from a Minuteman launch control center to an individual missile by communications lines.  Prior to the Improved Launch Control System, new missile guidance had to be loaded at the launch facility; the process usually took hours.

History
The Improved Launch Control System was operational at most Minuteman II wings (except the 44th Missile Wing, which was never upgraded) by the late 1970s. Minuteman III wings had a similar install, designated Command Data Buffer, providing the newer system the potential for remote retargetting.

Phaseout
The system was phased out in mid-1990s by the retirement of the Minuteman II force, and the inactivation or reapportioning of units to Minuteman III. It was replaced by the Rapid Execution and Combat Targeting System.

Chronology
1979
1 Mar - 341 SMW's 490th Strategic Missile Squadron completes the Improved Launch Control System upgrades, at a cost of $365 million.

See also
 LGM-30 Minuteman
 Launch control center (ICBM)
 Command Data Buffer - Minuteman III upgrade similar to the Improved Launch Control System

References

United States nuclear command and control
Cold War weapons of the United States
Nuclear weapons of the United States
Weapons and ammunition introduced in 1979
1979 in military history
1979 in science
1979 establishments in the United States